The Church Committee (formally the United States Senate Select Committee to Study Governmental Operations with Respect to Intelligence Activities) was a US Senate select committee in 1975 that  investigated abuses by the Central Intelligence Agency (CIA), National Security Agency (NSA), Federal Bureau of Investigation (FBI), and the Internal Revenue Service (IRS). Chaired by Idaho Senator Frank Church (D-ID), the committee was part of a series of investigations into intelligence abuses in 1975, dubbed the "Year of Intelligence", including its House counterpart, the Pike Committee, and the presidential Rockefeller Commission. The committee's efforts led to the establishment of the permanent US Senate Select Committee on Intelligence.

The most shocking revelations of the committee include Operation MKULTRA involving the drugging and torture of unwitting US citizens as part of human experimentation on mind control; COINTELPRO involving the surveillance and infiltration of American political and civil-rights organizations; Family Jewels, a CIA program to covertly assassinate foreign leaders; Operation Mockingbird as a systematic propaganda campaign with domestic and foreign journalists operating as CIA assets and dozens of US news organizations providing cover for CIA activity.

It also unearthed Project SHAMROCK in which the major telecommunications companies shared their traffic with the NSA (while officially confirming the existence of this signals intelligence agency to the public for the first time).

Background
By the early years of the 1970s, a series of troubling revelations had appeared in the press concerning intelligence activities. First came the revelations by Army intelligence officer Christopher Pyle in January 1970 of the US Army's spying on the civilian population and Senator Sam Ervin's Senate investigations produced more revelations. Then on December 22, 1974, The New York Times published a lengthy article by Seymour Hersh detailing operations engaged in by the CIA over the years that had been dubbed the "family jewels". Covert action programs involving assassination attempts on foreign leaders and covert attempts to subvert foreign governments were reported for the first time. In addition, the article discussed efforts by intelligence agencies to collect information on the political activities of US citizens.

The creation of the Church Committee was approved on January 27, 1975, by a vote of 82 to 4 in the Senate.

Overview
The Church Committee's final report was published in April 1976 in six books. Also published were seven volumes of Church Committee hearings in the Senate.

Before the release of the final report, the committee also published an interim report titled "Alleged Assassination Plots Involving Foreign Leaders", which investigated alleged attempts to assassinate foreign leaders, including Patrice Lumumba of Zaire, Rafael Trujillo of the Dominican Republic, Ngo Dinh Diem of South Vietnam, Gen. René Schneider of Chile and Fidel Castro of Cuba. President Gerald Ford urged the Senate to withhold the report from the public, but failed, and under recommendations and pressure by the committee, Ford issued Executive Order 11905 (ultimately replaced in 1981 by President Reagan's Executive Order 12333) to ban US sanctioned assassinations of foreign leaders.

In addition, the committee produced seven case studies on covert operations, but only the one on Chile was released, titled "Covert Action in Chile: 1963–1973". The rest were kept secret at CIA's request.

According to a declassified National Security Agency history, the Church Committee also helped to uncover the NSA's Watch List. The information for the list was compiled into the so-called "Rhyming Dictionary" of biographical information, which at its peak held millions of names—thousands of which were US citizens. Some prominent members of this list were Joanne Woodward, Thomas Watson, Walter Mondale, Art Buchwald, Arthur F. Burns, Gregory Peck, Otis G. Pike, Tom Wicker, Whitney Young, Howard Baker, Frank Church, David Dellinger, Ralph Abernathy, and others.

But among the most shocking revelations of the committee was the discovery of Operation SHAMROCK, in which the major telecommunications companies shared their traffic with the NSA from 1945 to the early 1970s. The information gathered in this operation fed directly into the Watch List. In 1975, the committee decided to unilaterally declassify the particulars of this operation, against the objections of President Ford's administration.

Together, the Church Committee's reports have been said to constitute the most extensive review of intelligence activities ever made available to the public. Much of the contents were classified, but over 50,000 pages were declassified under the President John F. Kennedy Assassination Records Collection Act of 1992.

Committee members

Investigation about JFK Assassination 
The commission also carried out an investigation into the assassination of John F. Kennedy on November 22, 1963, questioning 50 witnesses and accessing 3,000 documents. It focused on the actions of the FBI and CIA, and their support for the Warren Commission.

The Church commission raised the question of the possible connection between the plans to assassinate political leaders abroad, particularly in Cuba, and that of the 35th President of the United States.

The Church Commission questioned the processes for obtaining information, blaming federal agencies for failing in their duties and responsibilities and concluding that the investigation into the assassination had been deficient.

It participated to the creation of the House Select Committee on Assassinations (HSCA), the second major investigation of the JFK assassination, from 1976 to 1979.

Opening mail
The Church Committee learned that, beginning in the 1950s, the CIA and Federal Bureau of Investigation had intercepted, opened and photographed more than 215,000 pieces of mail by the time the program (called "HTLINGUAL") was shut down in 1973. This program was all done under the "mail covers" program (a mail cover is a process by which the government records—without any requirement for a warrant or for notification—all information on the outside of an envelope or package, including the name of the sender and the recipient). The Church report found that the CIA was careful about keeping the United States Postal Service from learning that government agents were opening mail. CIA agents moved mail to a private room to open the mail or in some cases opened envelopes at night after stuffing them in briefcases or in coat pockets to deceive postal officials.

The Ford administration and the Church Committee
On May 9, 1975, the Church Committee decided to call acting CIA director William Colby. That same day Ford's top advisers (Henry Kissinger, Donald Rumsfeld, Philip W. Buchen, and John Marsh) drafted a recommendation that Colby be authorized to brief only rather than testify, and that he would be told to discuss only the general subject, with details of specific covert actions to be avoided except for realistic hypotheticals.  But the Church Committee had full authority to call a hearing and require Colby's testimony. Ford and his top advisers met with Colby to prepare him for the hearing. Colby testified, "These last two months have placed American intelligence in danger. The almost hysterical excitement surrounding any news story mentioning CIA or referring even to a perfectly legitimate activity of CIA has raised a question whether secret intelligence operations can be conducted by the United States."

Results of the investigation
On August 17, 1975 Senator Frank Church appeared on NBC's Meet the Press, and discussed the NSA, without mentioning it by name:

Aftermath
As a result of the political pressure created by the revelations of the Church Committee and the Pike Committee investigations, President Gerald Ford issued Executive Order 11905. This executive order banned political assassinations: "No employee of the United States Government shall engage in, or conspire to engage in, political assassination." Senator Church criticized this move on the ground that any future president could easily set aside or change this executive order by a further executive order. Further, President Jimmy Carter issued Executive Order 12036, which in some ways expanded Executive Order 11905.

In 1977, the reporter Carl Bernstein wrote an article in the Rolling Stone magazine, stating that the relationship between the CIA and the media was far more extensive than what the Church Committee revealed. Bernstein said that the committee had covered it up, because it would have shown "embarrassing relationships in the 1950s and 1960s with some of the most powerful organizations and individuals in American journalism."

R. Emmett Tyrrell Jr., editor of the conservative magazine The American Spectator, wrote that the committee "betrayed CIA agents and operations." The committee had not received names, so had none to release, as confirmed by later CIA director George H. W. Bush. However, Senator Jim McClure used the allegation in the 1980 election, when Church was defeated.

The Committee's work has more recently been criticized after the September 11 attacks, for leading to legislation reducing the ability of the CIA to gather human intelligence. In response to such criticism, the chief counsel of the committee, Frederick A. O. Schwarz Jr., retorted with a book co-authored by Aziz Z. Huq, denouncing the Bush administration's use of 9/11 to make "monarchist claims" that are "unprecedented on this side of the North Atlantic".

In September 2006, the University of Kentucky hosted a forum called "Who's Watching the Spies? Intelligence Activities and the Rights of Americans", bringing together two Democratic committee members, former Vice President of the United States Walter Mondale and former US Senator Walter "Dee" Huddleston of Kentucky, and Schwarz to discuss the committee's work, its historical impact, and how it pertains to today's society.

See also
 COINTELPRO
 FBI–King suicide letter
 Hope Commission (established to investigate Australia's intelligence agencies)
 House Judiciary Select Subcommittee on the Weaponization of the Federal Government
 Hughes–Ryan Amendment
 Human rights violations by the CIA
 JFK Assassination 
 Operation Gladio (included in the classified part of the report)
 Operation Mockingbird
 Pike Committee
 Presidential Emergency Action Documents
 Project MKUltra
 Project Mockingbird
 Project SHAMROCK
 Rockefeller Commission
 The Shadow Factory
 Surveillance abuse
 Unethical human experimentation in the United States
 Special Activities Center (CIA)

References

Further reading

External links

 Church Committee reports (Assassination Archives and Research Center)
 National Security Agency Tracking of U.S. Citizens – "Questionable Practices" from 1960s & 1970s published by the National Security Archive
 Church Report: Covert Action in Chile 1963-1973 (US Dept. of State)
 Interviews with William Colby and Richard Helms from cia.gov
 Recollections from the Church Committee's Investigation of NSA from cia.gov
 Church Committee Reports (Mary Ferrell Foundation)
 
 Church Committee Report On Diem Coup
 Flashback: A Look Back at the Church Committee’s Investigation into CIA, FBI Misuse of Power
 The Church Committee: Idaho's Reaction to Its Senator's Involvement in the Investigation of the Intelligence Community

Central Intelligence Agency operations
Reports of the United States government
Investigations and hearings of the United States Congress
Defunct committees of the United States Senate
Lockheed bribery scandals
Publications of the United States government
1975 establishments in Washington, D.C.
Official enquiries concerning the assassination of John F. Kennedy
1976 disestablishments in Washington, D.C.
Select Committees of the United States Congress